Vəng (also, Bank, Vank, and Vank Pervyy) is a village and municipality in the Ismailli Rayon of Azerbaijan.  It has a population of 400.

References 

Populated places in Ismayilli District